The 2018 Women's Indoor Hockey World Cup was the fifth edition of this tournament and played from 7 to 11 February 2018 in Berlin, Germany.

Germany defeated the Netherlands 2–1 in the final to win their third title, while Belarus secured their first medal.

Qualification
Twelve teams participated in the tournament.

Umpires
12 umpires were appointed by the FIH for this tournament.

Karine Alves (FRA)
Vilma Bagdanskienė (LTU)
Emily Carroll (AUS)
Claire Druijts (NED)
Elena Eskina (RUS)
Ana Faias (POR)
Maggie Giddens (USA)
Ornpimol Kittiteerasopon (THA)
Michelle Meister (GER)
Gabriele Schmitz (GER)
Rachel Williams (ENG)
Sarah Wilson (SCO)

Results
The schedule was released on 19 September 2017.

All times are local (UTC+1).

First round

Pool A

Pool B

Second round

Quarter-finals

Eleventh and twelfth place

Ninth and tenth place

First to fourth place classification

Semi-finals

Third and fourth place

Final

Final standings

Awards

Goalscorers

References

External links
Official website
FIH website

Women's Indoor Hockey World Cup
Indoor World Cup
Indoor Hockey World Cup Women
International women's indoor hockey competitions hosted by Germany
Indoor Hockey World Cup Women
Indoor Hockey World Cup Women
Sports competitions in Berlin
Women in Berlin
World Cup